The 1978 Calder Cup playoffs of the American Hockey League began on April 11, 1978. The top three teams from each division qualified for the playoffs. The two division winners earned byes for the Division Semifinals while the other two teams in each division played best-of-five series. The winners played best-of-seven series with the team that received the first round bye in their division. The winners of each Division Final played a best-of-seven series for the Calder Cup.  The Calder Cup Final ended on May 15, 1978, with the Maine Mariners defeating the New Haven Nighthawks four games to one to win the Calder Cup for the first time in team history.

Playoff seeds
After the 1977–78 AHL regular season, the top three teams from each division qualified for the playoffs. The Maine Mariners finished the regular season with the best overall record. The two division champions earned byes to the Division Finals.

Northern Division
Maine Mariners - 95 points
Nova Scotia Voyageurs - 90 points
Springfield Indians - 87 points

Southern Division
Rochester Americans - 93 points
New Haven Nighthawks - 87 points
Philadelphia Firebirds - 81 points

Bracket

In each round, the team that earned more points during the regular season receives home ice advantage, meaning they receive the "extra" game on home-ice if the series reaches the maximum number of games. There is no set series format due to arena scheduling conflicts and travel considerations.

Division Semifinals 
Note: Home team is listed first.

Byes
Maine Mariners (Northern Division regular-season champions)
Rochester Americans (Southern Division regular-season champions)

Northern Division

(2) Nova Scotia Voyageurs vs. (3) Springfield Indians

Southern Division

(2) New Haven Nighthawks vs. (3) Philadelphia Firebirds

Division Finals

Northern Division

(1) Maine Mariners vs. (2) Nova Scotia Voyageurs

Southern Division

(1) Rochester Americans vs. (2) New Haven Nighthawks

Calder Cup Final

(N1) Maine Mariners vs. (S2) New Haven Nighthawks

See also
1977–78 AHL season
List of AHL seasons

References

Calder Cup
Calder Cup playoffs